KLXS-FM (95.3 FM, "Country 95.3") is a radio station licensed to serve Pierre, South Dakota.  The station is owned by Riverfront Broadcasting LLC. It airs a country music format.

The station was assigned the KLXS-FM call letters by the Federal Communications Commission on April 29, 1988.

On July 3, 2012 KLXS-FM changed their format from adult hits (as "Jack FM") to country, branded as "Country 95.3".

Ownership
In February 2008, Riverfront Broadcasting LLC reached an agreement with NRG Media to purchase this station as part of a six station deal.

Previous logo

References

External links
KLXS-FM official website 

LXS-FM
Country radio stations in the United States
Radio stations established in 1981
Riverfront Broadcasting LLC
Hughes County, South Dakota